Reliance Home Comfort is a residential and commercial services company in Canada and US primarily focused on rental, sales and maintenance of water heaters, water purification, smart home and heating, ventilation, and air conditioning systems. The company has its largest base of operations in Ontario, but also has offices in western Canada and USA. It serves 1.7 million customer households across Canada and US.

Reliance is currently controlled by the family of Hong Kong-based Chinese-Canadian businessman Victor Li, through two of their holding companies, CK Asset Holdings (75%) and CK Infrastructure Holdings (25%).

History 

Reliance has its origins in the storage water heater rental business formerly owned by natural gas utility Union Gas, which served much of Ontario. Reliance's main Ontario competitor, Enercare, has a similar origin as the rental business of Toronto-area utility Consumers' Gas. (The utility operations of both Union and Consumers' are now part of Enbridge.)

Beginning in the mid-20th century, Ontario gas providers such as Consumers' and Union would work with home builders to pre-install gas-powered water heaters, which the providers would agree to subsidize and maintain in exchange for a monthly rental charge on each homeowner's gas bill. This practice of renting water heaters, as opposed to purchasing them, became widespread in Ontario, but is not common elsewhere in Canada yet.

Due to regulatory changes, Union Gas' unregulated water heater business was split off in 1999 as a sister company named Union Energy. Union Energy was then acquired in 2001 by Epcor for about $160 million, then spun off as the UE Waterheater Income Fund in 2003. The fund was purchased in 2007 by Alinda Capital Partners for $1.74 billion.

UE Waterheater, which later rebranded as Reliance, purchased security companies Voxcom and Protectron in 2007, operating them under the "Reliance Protectron" name until selling the operations to ADT in 2014. ADT Canada was subsequently acquired by Telus in 2019.

Since the sale of Protectron, Reliance has refocused on home maintenance services, including expansion into western Canada. It also acquired competitor National Home Services from Just Energy in 2014. Reliance was then purchased from Alinda by the CK group in 2017 for $2.8 billion.

Products and services 
In addition to water heater rentals (and sales in some areas), Reliance sells, rents, installs, and maintains furnaces and air conditioners. It also offers maintenance and repair plans for heating and cooling systems, as well as for plumbing and electrical systems.

Criticism 
Although not specific to Reliance, the water heater rental business model has been noted as being a poor value for many consumers. The federal Competition Bureau has noted that purchasing a water heater outright "can result in substantial savings over time" compared to rental. However, Reliance and other rental companies argue that because their rentals include maintenance, including replacement parts and labour, they can provide peace of mind for consumers.

The Competition Bureau filed complaints against Reliance and Direct Energy (then-owner of what is now Enercare) in 2012, alleging both companies engaged in anti-competitive behaviour by providing customers limited locations and time windows if they wished to return their rentals, and charging "unwarranted" cancellation fees. Reliance defended its policies, asserting that it was intended to help protect consumers against what it called aggressive tactics by competing rental suppliers. The company settled its part of the complaint in 2014 by agreeing to make it easier for customers to cancel their rentals and paying a $5 million administrative penalty.

Reliance has used fallacious collections actions to attempt to extract payments from numerous non-customers for goods and service not provided.

References

External links 
 Official website

Companies based in Toronto
Canadian companies established in 1999
Heating, ventilation, and air conditioning companies
Service companies of Canada
CK Hutchison Holdings